Žulj is a village in the municipality of Sokolac, Bosnia and Herzegovina. In 1991 it had a population of 75 people.

References

Populated places in Sokolac